Wamanrao Bapurao Kasawar is an Indian politician. He was elected to the Maharashtra Legislative Assembly from Wani, Maharashtra in 1990 until 2014 as a member of the Indian National Congress.

References 

Indian National Congress politicians from Maharashtra
Living people
Year of birth missing (living people)
Rashtrasant Tukadoji Maharaj Nagpur University alumni
People from Yavatmal district
Maharashtra MLAs 1990–1995
Maharashtra MLAs 1995–1999
Maharashtra MLAs 1999–2004
Maharashtra MLAs 2004–2009
Maharashtra MLAs 2009–2014